Radom is a city in east-central Poland, located approximately  south of the capital, Warsaw. It is situated on the Mleczna River in the Masovian Voivodeship (since 1999), having previously been the seat of a separate Radom Voivodeship (1975–1998). Radom is the fourteenth-largest city in Poland and the second-largest in its province with a population of 214,755 (31.06.2022)

For centuries, Radom was part of the Sandomierz Province of the Kingdom of Poland and the later Polish–Lithuanian Commonwealth. Despite being part of the Masovian Voivodeship, the city historically belongs to Lesser Poland. It was a significant center of administration, having served as seat of the Crown Council which ratified the Pact of Vilnius and Radom between Lithuania and Poland in 1401. The Nihil novi and Łaski's Statute were adopted by the Sejm at Radom's Royal Castle in 1505. In 1976, it was a center of the June 1976 protests.

The city is home to the biennial Radom Air Show, the largest air show in the country, held during the last weekend of August. "Radom" is also the popular unofficial name for a semiautomatic FB Vis pistol, which was produced from 1935 to 1944 by Radom's Łucznik Arms Factory. The city continues to produce military firearms for the Polish Armed Forces.

The international Radom Jazz Festival and the International Gombrowicz Theater Festival are held in the city.

History 

Radom's original settlement dates back to the 8th–9th century. It was an early medieval town in the valley of the Mleczna River (on the approximate site of present-day Old Town). In the second half of the 10th century, it became a gord, called Piotrówka, which was protected by a rampart and a moat. Due to convenient location on the edge of a large wilderness, and its proximity to the border of Lesser Poland and Mazovia, Radom quickly emerged as an important administrative center of the early Kingdom of Poland. Piotrówka was probably named after St. Peter church, which in 1222 was placed under the authority of a Benedictine Abbey in nearby Sieciechów. The church no longer exists; the oldest still-extant church in Radom is St. Wacław, founded in the 13th century by Prince of Sandomierz Leszek I the White. The first documented mention of Radom comes from the year 1155, in a bull of Pope Adrian IV (villam iuxta Rado, que vocatur Zlauno, or a village near Radom, called Sławno). By 1233, Radom was the seat of a castellan. The name of the city comes from the ancient Slavic given name Radomir, and Radom means a gord, which belongs to Radomir.

In the second half of the 13th century, Radom was granted a Środa Śląska town charter by Prince Bolesław V the Chaste, although no documents exist to confirm the exact date of this event. The town prospered in the 14th century, when in 1350 King Kazimierz Wielki established the so-called New Town, with a royal castle, a defensive wall, and a town hall. There was also a market square and a grid plan of the streets, patterned after Gothic German towns. The area of New Town was 9 hectares, and the length of the defensive wall was 1,100 meters. Radom had three gates, named after main merchant roads: Iłża Gate, Piotrków Trybunalski Gate, and Lublin Gate. The defensive wall was further protected by 25 fortified towers. New Town had the Church of John the Baptist, and the Royal Castle was built between the church and the moat.

In 1364, Radom's obsolete Środa Śląska rights were replaced with more modern Magdeburg rights, and residents gained several privileges as a result. At that time, Radom was located along the so-called Oxen Trail, from Ruthenian lands to Silesia. In 1376, the city became the seat of a starosta, and entered the period of its greatest prosperity.

Poland's Golden Age
King Władysław Jagiełło granted several privileges to the city. Jagiełło himself frequently travelled from Kraków to Vilnius, and liked to stay at Radom Castle en route. On March 18, 1401, the Pact of Vilnius and Radom was signed, which strengthened the Polish–Lithuanian union. Immediately after the Pact, preparations for the Polish–Lithuanian–Teutonic War began. King Casimir IV Jagiellon frequently visited Radom, along with his wife, Elizabeth of Austria. Here, the King would host foreign envoys, from such countries as the Crimean Khanate, the Kingdom of Bohemia, and the Duchy of Bavaria. On November 18, 1489, Johann von Tiefen, the Grand Master of the Teutonic Knights, paid homage to King Jagiellon at Radom Castle. Mikołaj Radomski, one of the earliest Polish composers, comes from Radom. In 1468, the complex of a Bernardine church and monastery was founded here by King Jagiellon, with support of the local starosta, Dominik z Kazanowa. The complex was originally made of wood (until 1507).

In 1481, Radom became the residence of Prince Kazimierz, the son of King Jagiellon, who ruled the Grand Duchy of Lithuania. The young prince died of tuberculosis, and later became patron saint of both the city of Radom (since 1983), and the Roman Catholic Diocese of Radom (since 1992). During the reign of Alexander Jagiellon, the Nihil novi act was adopted by the Polish Sejm in a meeting at Radom Castle. Furthermore, at the same meeting, the first codification of law published in the Kingdom of Poland was accepted. Radom was a royal city, county seat and castellany, administratively located in the Sandomierz Voivodeship in the Lesser Poland Province of the Polish Crown. It remained one of the most important urban centers of the Sandomierz Voivodeship, and was also the seat of the Treasure Tribunal in 1613–1764, which controlled taxation. Several kings visited the city, including Stephen Bathory and his wife Anna Jagiellon, Sigismund III Vasa, and August III Sas. In 1623 many residents died in an epidemic, and in 1628, half of Radom burned in a fire.

The period of prosperity ended during the Swedish invasion of Poland. The Swedish army captured the city without a fight in November 1655. At first the invaders behaved correctly, as King Charles X Gustav still sought alliances within the Polish-Lithuanian nobility; the situation changed, however, in early 1656, when anti-Swedish uprisings broke out in southern Lesser Poland and quickly spread across the country. Radom was looted and almost completely destroyed in August 1656. Its population shrank from some 2,000 before the war, to 395 in 1660, with only 37 houses still standing. Swedish soldiers burned the royal castle and the monastery. With the Polish population in decline, the number of Jewish settlers grew by the early 18th century. In 1682 the first Piarists arrived, and in 1737–1756, opened a college.

Late modern era
Radom remained within the Sandomierz Voivodeship of the Lesser Poland Province of the Polish Crown of the Polish–Lithuanian Commonwealth until the Third Partition of Poland (1795). For a few years (1795–1809) it was part of the Austrian province of West Galicia, and then (1809–1815) part of the Polish Duchy of Warsaw, which named it capital of the Radom Department. From 1815 the city belonged to Russian-controlled Congress Poland, remaining a regional administrative center. In 1816–1837 it was the capital of the Sandomierz Voivodeship, whose capital, despite the name, was at Radom. In 1837–1844 it was the capital of the Sandomierz Governorate, and from 1844 until the outbreak of World War I, the capital of the Radom Governorate. The city was an important center of the November Uprising. Its obsolete and ruined fortifications were destroyed upon order of Mayor Józef Królikowski. In the early days of the January Uprising, Marian Langiewicz visited Radom, preparing the rebellion. In 1867 a sewage system was built. Russians closed down the Benedictine monastery and established a Tsarist prison in its place. Streets were gradually paved, and in 1885, a rail line from Dąbrowa Górnicza to Dęblin was completed, via Radom. In the early 20th century a power plant was built. In 1906, notable Polish independence fighter Kazimierz Sosnkowski, future politician and general, escaped from Warsaw to Radom, pursued by the Russian Okhrana. In Radom, he continued his secret activities, and became the commander of the local Combat Organization, before he eventually had to escape again, this time to the Dąbrowa Basin.

During World War I, the city was captured by the Austro-Hungarian Army in July 1915. An Austrian garrison remained until November 1918.

In the Second Polish Republic Radom became part of Kielce Voivodeship. In 1932 the City County of Radom was created, and the following year, its rail connection with Warsaw was completed. In the late 1930s, due to the government project known as the Central Industrial Area, several new factories were built; by 1938, the population had grown to 80,000. The city was also a military garrison, serving as headquarters of the 72nd Infantry Regiment.

World War II
On September 1, 1939, the first day of the German invasion of Poland and World War II, the Germans air raided the city. On September 8, 1939, Radom was captured by the Wehrmacht, and was afterwards occupied by Germany. On September 21, 1939, the German Einsatzgruppe II entered the city to commit various crimes against the population, and afterwards its members co-formed the local German police and security forces. The Germans immediately confiscated the food stored in warehouses in Radom and nearby settlements, and carried out requisitions in the city council. The occupiers established a special court in Radom, and two temporary prisoner-of-war camps for captured Polish soldiers, one in the pre-war military barracks and one in the Tadeusz Kościuszko Park. There were poor conditions in the camp in the barracks, and hunger and diseases were common. The local civilian population helped many POWs escape from the camp.

From October 1939 to January 1940, the Germans carried out several public executions of Polish civilians in various locations in Radom, killing 111 people. The Germans also operated a heavy prison in the city, and carried mass arrests of hundreds of Poles, who were then held in the prison. Many Poles expelled from Gdynia in 1939 were placed in a temporary transit camp in a local church, before they were sent to nearby settlements.

The occupiers liquidated local cultural and social life. All sports clubs and high schools were closed, and teaching of literature, geography and history in the remaining schools was prohibited.

In March and May 1940, the Germans carried out massacres of 210 Poles, including teenagers, from Radom and nearby settlements in the city's Firlej district. Around 100 Poles from Radom were murdered by the Russians in the large Katyn massacre in April–May 1940. In July, August and November 1940, the Germans carried out deportations of Poles from the local prison to the Auschwitz concentration camp. Deportations to concentration camps continued throughout the war, and 18,000 people passed through the local prison, mostly Polish political activists, resistance members and innocent people, plus ordinary criminals. At the large massacre sites in the present-day districts of Firlej and Kosów, the Germans murdered around 15,000 and 1,500 people, respectively.

In October 1940, the German occupiers established a forced labour camp for Jews, and in 1941, they formed the Radom Ghetto, with a population of 34,000 Jews, most of whom perished at the Treblinka extermination camp. According to German regulations, sheltering Jews outside the ghetto was punishable by death. The secret Polish Council to Aid Jews "Żegota", established by the Polish resistance movement operated in the city.

Radom was a center of Polish resistance, with various organizations, such as Service for Poland's Victory, Union of Armed Struggle, Bataliony Chłopskie, Grey Ranks and numerous Home Army units operating in the area. The resistance carried out various actions, which included sabotage, stealing weapons, secret education, etc. Poles were even able to produce weapons for Polish partisans in the local arms factory, even though it was seized by the Germans. In 1942, the Germans discovered the activity, and then publicly hanged 50 Poles, including 26 employees of the arms factory, and a pregnant woman. Scouts from the Gray Ranks who worked at the local post office stole and destroyed anonymous letters to the Gestapo, thus possibly saving many lives. Two German doctors from a local hospital helped the Polish resistance, for which one was even arrested and sent to a concentration camp. In April 1943, the resistance successfully assassinated the chief of the local German police.

In 1944, following the Polish Warsaw Uprising, the Germans deported thousands of Varsovians from the Dulag 121 camp in Pruszków, where they were initially imprisoned, to Radom. Those Poles were mainly old people, ill people and women with children. 3,500 Poles expelled from Warsaw stayed in the city, as of November 1, 1944.

In January 1945, the occupiers sent the last transport of prisoners from Radom to Auschwitz, but it only reached Częstochowa, while the remaining prisoners were massacred in Firlej.

On January 16, 1945, the city was captured by the Red Army, and then restored to Poland, although with a Soviet-installed communist regime, which then stayed in power until the Fall of Communism in the 1980s. Fallen Red Army soldiers rest at the local cemetery at Warszawska Street. The communists held Polish resistance members in the former German prison. In September 1945, the resistance movement attacked the communist prison and liberated nearly 500 prisoners.

Up to the Second World War, like many other cities in interwar Poland, Radom had a large Jewish population. According to the Imperial 1897 census, out of the total population of 28,700, Jews constituted

Current events
In 1984, city limits were greatly expanded by including several settlements as new districts, including Długojów Górny, Huta Józefowska, Janiszpol, Józefów, Kierzków, Kończyce, Krychnowice, Krzewień, Malczew, Mleczna, Nowa Wola Gołębiowska, Nowiny Malczewskie, Stara Wola Gołębiowska, Wincentów, Wólka Klwatecka.

In 2007, two pilots died in an accident at the air show, resulting in the cancellation of the rest of the event.  On  2009, also during the air show, another two pilots who represented Belarus were killed when their plane crashed.

Radom was one of the main centres of the strike action taken by Polish health care workers in 2007.

Geography

Climate 
Radom has a humid continental climate (Köppen: Dfb).

Places of interest 

 St Waenceslaus Church in the Old Town Square: founded by Leszek I the White, built in the 13th century in Gothic style
 St John the Baptist Church: founded by Casimir III, built in the years 1360–1370 in gothic style, and re-constructed many times
 Bernardine Church and monastery: founded by Casimir IV of Poland, built in the years 1468–1507
 Holy Trinity Church: built in the years 1619–1627 in Baroque style, burned in a fire and was rebuilt in the years 1678–1691
 Gąska's and Esterka's Houses from the 16th–17th century
 Evangelical Church of the Augsburg Confession: built in 1785
 Sandomierz Palace: building of voivodeship council, built in the years 1825–1827, designed in classical style by Antonio Corazzi
 City hall: built in the years 1847–1848
 Cathedral of Virgin Mary: built in the years 1899–1908 in Gothic Revival style
 Resursa Citizen's Club building built in 1852
 Podworski House built in the Renaissance Revival style in 1867
 Tool gates: built in the nineteenth century in classical style
 Tadeusz Kościuszko Park opened in 1867
Radom Air Show: the most popular air show in Poland

Culture

The arts

Philharmonic
 Radom Chamber Orchestra established in 2007

Cinemas
 Elektrownia
 Helios cinema
 Hel (currently not functioning)
 Multikino cinema

Theatre
 Jan Kochanowski Theatre

Museums and art galleries
 Jacek Malczewski Museum
 Modern art museum
 Scouting Museum
 "Elektrownia" - Power station built in 1903, renewed as a Modern art gallery
 Cultural Heritage Gallery of Radom
 Skansen in Radom

Sports

 Rosa Radom - men's basketball team, founded in 2003, currently playing in the Polish Basketball League (country's top division) and the international Basketball Champions League.
 Czarni Radom - men's volleyball team, founded in 1921, currently playing in the PlusLiga (Poland's top division).
 Radomiak Radom - men's football team, founded in 1910, currently playing in the Ekstraklasa (top tier).
 Broń Radom - men's football team, founded in 1926, currently playing in the III liga (fourth tier).
 Jadar Radom - defunct men's volleyball team, which played in the PlusLiga in 2006–10.

Transport

Radom is an important railroad junction, where two lines meet: east–west connection from Lublin to Łódź, and north–south from Warsaw to Kielce, and Kraków. The city is also located close 
to European route E77, here the European route E371 begins, which runs southwards, to Slovakia.

Education 

Radom is home to about 20 schools of higher education:

 Instytut Teologiczny Uniwersytetu Kardynała Stefana Wyszyńskiego w Radomiu - department of theology
 Kolegium Nauczycielskie
 Nauczycielskie Kolegium Języków Obcych
 Niepubliczne Nauczycielskie Kolegium Języków Obcych
 Niepubliczne Nauczycielskie Kolegium Języków Obcych TWP
 Kazimierz Pułaski University of Technology and Humanities in Radom (Uniwersytet Technologiczno-Humanistyczny im. Kazimierza Pułaskiego)
 University College of Environmental Sciences (Wyższa Szkoła Ochrony Środowiska)
 Radomska Szkoła Zarządzania
 Warsaw Agricultural University - department in Radom (Szkoła Główna Gospodarstwa Wiejskiego w Warszawie)
 College of the Maria Curie-Skłodowska University (Kolegium licencjackie Uniwersytetu Marii Curie-Skłodowskiej)
 Warsaw University - department in Radom (Uniwersytet Warszawski)
 Maria Curie-Skłodowska University - department in Radom (Uniwersytet Marii Curie-Skłodowskiej)
 Wyższa Inżynierska Szkoła Bezpieczeństwa i Organizacji Pracy
 Higher Business College (Wyższa Szkoła Biznesu)
 Higher Financial and Banking College (Wyższa Szkoła Finansów i Bankowości)
 Higher Merchant College (Wyższa Szkoła Handlowa)
 Higher Seminary (Wyższe Seminarium Duchowne)
 Higher Journalis College (Wyższa Szkoła Dziennikarska)
 Zespół Szkół Medycznych

Other

 At the Western part of Radom, there is a facility for commercial LF transmission (not broadcasting), the Radom longwave transmitter
 The Łucznik Arms Factory in Radom produces a range of military firearms such as assault rifles
 The book, Outcry - Holocaust Memoirs, by Manny Steinberg, chronicles a young Jewish man's life and trials during the Nazi occupation of Radom and beyond. Published by Amsterdam Publishers, The Netherlands in 2014.
 The Kurc family lives in Radom at the opening of the narrative non-fiction novel We Were the Lucky Ones by Georgia Hunter.

Politics 
Members of Parliament (Sejm) elected from Radom constituency
 Ewa Kopacz (PO)
 Dariusz Bąk (PIS)
 Mirosław Maliszewski (PSL)
 Czesław Czechyra (PO)
 Marek Suski (PIS)
 Marek Wikiński (SLD),
 Radosław Witkowski (PO)
 Krzysztof Sońta (PIS)
 Sandra Pachocka (NIC)

International relations

Twin towns — sister cities
Radom is twinned with:

Former twin towns:
 Homyel, Belarus
 Ozyory, Moscow Oblast, Russia

On 28 February 2022, Radom ended its partnership with the Russian city of Ozyory and the Belarusian city of Homyel as a reaction to the 2022 Russian invasion of Ukraine.

Notable people 

Notable people who have been born, have lived or have worked in Radom:

Notes

References

External links 

 
 

Official web page of Radom in English
Official web page of Radom in Polish
Radom Culture 
 http://www.nasz-radom.pl/
Radom photo gallery 
Jewish Community in Radom on Virtual Shtetl
 

 
Cities and towns in Masovian Voivodeship
City counties of Poland
Sandomierz Voivodeship
Radom Governorate
Kielce Voivodeship (1919–1939)
Holocaust locations in Poland